Lucas Bijker (born 4 March 1993) is a Dutch professional footballer who plays as a left back for Belgian club KV Mechelen.

Club career
Born in São Paulo, Brazil, Bijker came through SC Cambuur's youth system and made his senior debut for them in November 2011. In summer 2015 he joined arch rivals Heerenveen.

On 7 August 2017, Bijker signed a three-year contract with Spanish Segunda División club Cádiz CF, after impressing on a trial. He made his debut for the club on 19 August, starting in a 2–1 away win against Córdoba CF.

On 15 June 2018, Bijker was transferred to Belgian side KV Mechelen, with Cádiz retaining 15% of a future transfer. He signed a three-year contract with the club.

Personal life
In July 2013 Bijker was sentenced to 20 hours community service after he was found guilty of violently harassing two young women and a former teammate.

Honours

Club
SC Cambuur
 Eerste Divisie: 2012–13

Mechelen
 Belgian Cup: 2018–19

References

External links
 
 Voetbal International profile 

1993 births
Living people
Footballers from São Paulo
Dutch people of Brazilian descent
Brazilian people of Dutch descent
Brazilian footballers
Dutch footballers
Association football defenders
Eredivisie players
Eerste Divisie players
SC Cambuur players
SC Heerenveen players
Segunda División players
Cádiz CF players
K.V. Mechelen players
Netherlands youth international footballers
Dutch expatriate footballers
Dutch expatriate sportspeople in Spain
Dutch expatriate sportspeople in Belgium
Expatriate footballers in Spain
Expatriate footballers in Belgium